The Real Cycling Team was a Brazilian UCI Continental cycling team that existed from 2005 until 2012. The team was amateur status from 2005 to 2011 and UCI Continental in 2012. The team won the team ranking of the 2011-12 UCI America Tour.

References

UCI Continental Teams (America)
Cycling teams established in 2005
Cycling teams disestablished in 2012
Cycling teams based in Brazil
Defunct cycling teams
2005 establishments in Brazil
2012 disestablishments in Brazil